Elham Shahin (also spelled Ilham Shaheen, Ilham Shahin, Ilham Chahine, and Elham Shaheen) is an Egyptian actress.

She has appeared in many Egyptian films and television series and has won both Egyptian and international awards.

In 2021, she played a prostitute in the Jean-Paul Sartre play The Respectful Prostitute. Haaretz reported that this "caused political turmoil in Egypt".

Selected filmography

Reference

External links
 

1961 births
Living people
Actresses from Cairo
Egyptian film actresses
Egyptian television actresses